The 2017 WNBA season is the 21st season for the New York Liberty franchise of the WNBA. The season tips off on May 13. The Liberty rode an end of season surge to the top of the Eastern Conference and the third overall see in the WNBA playoffs.  The Liberty were 12–12 on August 4, but won 10 straight games to finish the season with a 22–12 record.  The team lost in the second round of the playoffs to the Washington Mystics after receiving a first round bye.

Transactions

WNBA Draft

Current roster

Game log

Preseason 

|- style="background:#bbffbb;"
| 1
| May 2
| Los Angeles
| W 81-65
| Vaughn (14)
| Vaughn (6)
| Boyd (4)
| Mohegan Sun Arena  2,782
| 1-0
|- style="background:#fcc;"
| 2
| May 3
| Chicago
| L 75-86
| Charles (14)
| Hartley (6)
| Charles (3)
| Mohegan Sun Arena  N/A
| 1-1
|- style="background:#fcc;"
| 3
| May 7
| Connecticut
| L 57-79
| Charles (20)
| Charles (9)
| Zahui B. (3)
| Columbia University  388
| 1-2

Regular season

|- style="background:#bbffbb;"
| 1
| May 13
| San Antonio
| W 73-64
| Charles (12)
| Charles (7)
| Zellous (4)
| Madison Square Garden  8,207
| 1-0
|- style="background:#fcc;"
| 2
| May 18
| Minnesota
| L 71-90
| Rodgers (20)
| Tied (7)
| Tied (3)
| Madison Square Garden  7,004
| 1-1
|- style="background:#bbffbb;"
| 3
| May 23
| Phoenix
| W 69-67
| Prince (24)
| Charles (11)
| Rodgers (4)
| Talking Stick Resort Arena  7,886
| 2-1
|- style="background:#fcc;"
| 4
| May 26
| Seattle
| L 81-87
| Charles (28)
| Tied (9)
| Prince (7)
| KeyArena  5,860
| 2-2
|- style="background:#fcc;"
| 5
| May 30
| Los Angeles
| L 75-90
| Charles (25)
| Zellous (7)
| Tied (5)
| Madison Square Garden  8,108
| 2-3

|- style="background:#bbffbb;"
| 6
| June 2
| Dallas
| W 93-89
| Charles (36)
| Stokes (15)
| Rodgers (5)
| Madison Square Garden  7,426
| 3-3
|- style="background:#bbffbb;"
| 7
| June 4
| Phoenix
| W 88-72
| Stokes (23)
| Stokes (14)
| Zellous (5)
| Madison Square Garden  7,831
| 4-3
|- style="background:#bbffbb;"
| 8
| June 7
| Atlanta
| W 76-61
| Charles (18)
| Stokes (17)
| Allen (4)
| Madison Square Garden  14,816
| 5-3
|- style="background:#bbffbb;"
| 9
| June 11
| Seattle
| W 94-86
| Tied (21)
| Charles (14)
| Rodgers (5)
| Madison Square Garden  8,564
| 6-3
|- style="background:#fcc;"
| 10
| June 14
| Connecticut
| L 76-96
| Charles (17)
| Tied (5)
| Tied (2)
| Mohegan Sun Arena  4,818
| 6-4
|- style="background:#bbffbb;"
| 11
| June 16
| Dallas
| W 102-93
| Zellous (28)
| Charles (10)
| Zellous (6)
| College Park Center  3,152
| 7-4
|- style="background:#fcc;"
| 12
| June 23
| Connecticut
| L 89-94
| Charles (20)
| Charles (11)
| Charles (6)
| Madison Square Garden  10,240
| 7-5
|- style="background:#fcc;"
| 13
| June 29
| Washington
| L 54-67
| Zellous (17)
| Vaughn (9)
| Prince (3)
| Verizon Center  5,490
| 7-6

|- style="background:#fcc;"
| 14
| July 2
| Atlanta
| L 72-81
| Charles (21)
| Zellous (9)
| Prince (9)
| McCamish Pavilion  3,521
| 7-7
|- style="background:#bbffbb;"
| 15
| July 6
| Seattle
| W 79-70
| Charles (29)
| Charles (12)
| Zellous (5)
| KeyArena  4,397
| 8-7
|- style="background:#fcc;"
| 16
| July 9
| Phoenix
| L 69-81
| Charles (29)
| Prince (9)
| Prince (4)
| Talking Stick Resort Arena  9,413
| 8-8
|- style="background:#fcc;"
| 17
| July 14
| Chicago
| L 68-78
| Charles (23)
| Charles (19)
| Prince (4)
| Madison Square Garden  9,341
| 8-9
|- style="background:#bbffbb;"
| 18
| July 16
| Washington
| W 85-55
| Hartley (15)
| Stokes (10)
| Rodgers (5)
| Madison Square Garden  10,204
| 9-9
|- style="background:#bbffbb;"
| 19
| July 19
| Connecticut
| W 96-80
| Charles (28)
| Charles (17)
| Zellous (6)
| Madison Square Garden  17,443
| 10-9
|- style="background:#fcc;"
| 20
| July 25
| Minnesota
| L 75-76
| Charles (24)
| Charles (16)
| Allen (5)
| Xcel Energy Center  10,123
| 10-10
|- style="background:#bbffbb;"
| 21
| July 28
| Indiana
| W 85-84
| Charles (25)
| Stokes (10)
| Zellous (5)
| Bankers Life Fieldhouse  6,617
| 11-10
|- style="background:#bbffbb;"
| 22
| July 30
| Chicago
| W 86-82
| Charles (15)
| Stokes (16)
| Charles (5)
| Allstate Arena  5,834
| 12-10

|- style="background:#fcc;"
| 23
| August 1
| San Antonio
| L 81-93
| Hartley (17)
| Charles (8)
| Hartley (5)
| AT&T Center  3,430
| 12-11
|- style="background:#fcc;"
| 24
| August 4
| Los Angeles
| L 74-87
| Hartley (16)
| Stokes (7)
| Tied (4)
| Staples Center  11,617
| 12-12
|- style="background:#bbffbb;"
| 25
| August 8
| Indiana
| W 81-76
| Charles (26)
| Zellous (8)
| Charles (4)
| Madison Square Garden  10,068
| 13-12
|- style="background:#bbffbb;"
| 26
| August 11
| Atlanta
| W 83-77
| Zellous (20)
| Charles (8)
| Zellous (4)
| McCamish Pavilion  5,158
| 14-12
|- style="background:#bbffbb;"
| 27
| August 13
| Los Angeles
| W 83-69
| Charles (21)
| Tied (7)
| Tied (5)
| Madison Square Garden  10,083
| 15-12
|- style="background:#bbffbb;"
| 28
| August 18
| Connecticut
| W 82-70
| Charles (24)
| Tied (7)
| Allen (3)
| Mohegan Sun Arena  7,016
| 16-12
|- style="background:#bbffbb;"
| 29
| August 20
| Minnesota
| W 70-61
| Charles (19)
| Charles (9)
| Tied (6)
| Madison Square Garden  10,007
| 17-12
|- style="background:#bbffbb;"
| 30
| August 23
| Indiana
| W 71-50
| Charles (13)
| Charles (9)
| Charles (3)
| Bankers Life Fieldhouse  7,118
| 18-12
|- style="background:#bbffbb;"
| 31
| August 25
| Washington
| W 74-66
| Tied (20)
| Vaughn (9)
| Hartley (3)
| Madison Square Garden  9,340
| 19-12
|- style="background:#bbffbb;"
| 32
| August 27
| Chicago
| W 92-62
| Charles (22)
| Stokes (10)
| Rodgers (6)
| Madison Square Garden  9,317
| 20-12

|- style="background:#bbffbb;"
| 33
| September 1
| San Antonio
| W 81-69
| Tied (16)
| Charles (8)
| Tied (4)
| Madison Square Garden  10,108
| 21-12
|- style="background:#bbffbb;"
| 34
| September 3
| Dallas
| W 82-81
| Prince (20)
| Charles (18)
| Tied (3)
| College Park Center  4,701
| 22-12

Playoffs

|- style="background:#fcc;"
| 1
| September 10
| Washington
| L 68-82
| Charles (18)
| Tied (6)
| Hartley (5)
| Madison Square Garden  9,538
| 0-1

Standings

Playoffs

Awards and honors

References

External links
The Official Site of the New York Liberty

New York Liberty seasons
New York Liberty